is a Japanese football player who plays for AC Nagano Parceiro.

Club statistics
Updated to 22 February 2018.

1Includes Emperor's Cup.

2Includes J.League Cup.

References

External links
 
 J. League (#33)
 

1993 births
Living people
Association football people from Hokkaido
Japanese footballers
J1 League players
J2 League players
J3 League players
2. Liga (Austria) players
Hokkaido Consadole Sapporo players
J.League U-22 Selection players
SV Horn players
Tochigi SC players
AC Nagano Parceiro players
Japanese expatriate footballers
Expatriate footballers in Austria
Japanese expatriate sportspeople in Austria
Association football forwards